Xaveri Burundi is a Catholic youth organization in the Burundi. Xaveri Burundi is part of the African Xaveri Movement and a member of the Catholic umbrella of youth organizations Fimcap.

History 
Xaveri Burundi was founded in 1953 by Reverend Frère Geolf.

References

Catholic youth organizations
Youth organisations based in Burundi
Fimcap
Catholic Church in Burundi